Canada competed at the 2012 Winter Youth Olympics in Innsbruck.  Beckie Scott was named as the chef de mission.

Canada did not send any speed skaters (long and short track), along with figure skaters after the governing body for the sport in the country (Speed Skating Canada and Skate Canada, respectively) deemed the event "not developmentally appropriate".

Medalists

Alpine skiing

Canada had qualified a full team of two boys and two girls. The team was announced on June 22, 2011.

Biathlon

Canada had qualified a full biathlon team of 2 boys and 2 girls. Canada's roster was announced on April 19, 2011.

Bobsleigh

Canada had qualified one boy and one girl sled.

Cross country skiing

Canada had qualified a team of 1 boy and 1 girl.

Curling

Canada had qualified a mixed curling team of 2 boys and 2 girls. Canada's roster was announced on April 8, 2011.

Skip: Thomas Scoffin
Third: Corryn Brown
Second: Derek Oryniak
Lead: Emily Gray

The mixed team event took place 14–18 January, while the mixed doubles tournament took place 20–22 January.

Mixed team

Round-robin results

Draw 1

Draw 2

Draw 3

Draw 4

Draw 5

Draw 6

Draw 7

Quarterfinals

Semifinals

Bronze-medal game

Final rank:

Mixed doubles

Round of 32

Round of 16

Quarterfinals

Figure skating

Canada had qualified an ice dancing team, a pair, and 2 boys' singles skaters. However, on January 4, 2012, it was announced that, due to a scheduling conflict with the Canadian nationals (held in Moncton, NB), Canada would not send figure skaters after all.

Freestyle skiing

Canada had qualified a full freestyle skiing team of 4 athletes.

Ice hockey

Canada would enter a boys team and it consisted of 17 athletes.

The co-coaches were announced October 14, 2011, and would be Jim Hulton and Curtis Hunt.

The players were announced October 21, 2011, and were selected through a process that involved a random draw from a list of 39 names established by Hockey Canada's thirteen branches, with each branch guaranteed at least one representative (Ontario, Québec and Alberta were guaranteed one extra representative each). The players selected are as follows.

Goaltenders:
 Keven Bouchard (QC)
 Sam Walsh (PEI)

Defence:
 Josh Carrick (ON)
 Jarrett Crossman (NB)
 Joe Hicketts (BC)
 Brycen Martin (AB)
 Brendan Nickerson (NS)
 Ryan Pilon (SK)

Forwards:
 Adam Brooks (MB)
 Ryan Burton (ON)
 Eric Cornel (ON)
 Reid Duke (AB)
 Reid Gardiner (SK)
 Ryan Gropp (BC)
 Nicolas Hébert (QC)
 Garrett James (ON)
 Nathan Yetman (NL)

Group A

Semifinals

Bronze-medal game

Final rank:

Luge

Canada had qualified a team of two boys and one girl.

Nordic combined

Canada had qualified one boy athlete.

Skeleton

Canada had qualified one boy and one girl in skeleton.

Ski jumping

Canada had qualified one boy and one girl athlete.

Snowboarding

Canada had qualified a full team of 4 athletes (2 boys and 2 girls).

See also
Canada at the 2012 Summer Olympics

References

2012 in Canadian sports
Nations at the 2012 Winter Youth Olympics
Canada at the Youth Olympics